The 1997 Campionati Internazionali di Sicilia was a men's tennis tournament played on outdoor clay courts in Palermo, Italy that was part of the World Series of the 1997 ATP Tour. It was the 18th edition of the tournament and was held from 29 September until 5 October 1997. Second-seeded Alberto Berasategui won the singles title.

Finals

Singles

 Alberto Berasategui defeated  Dominik Hrbatý, 6–4, 6–2
 It was Berasategui's 1st singles title of the year and the 13th of his career.

Doubles

 Andrew Kratzmann /  Libor Pimek defeated  Hendrik Jan Davids /  Daniel Orsanic, 3–6, 6–3, 7–6

References

External links
 ITF tournament edition details

Campionati Internazionali di Sicilia
Campionati Internazionali di Sicilia
Campionati Internazionali di Sicilia